Naemul of Silla (died 402) (r. 356–402) was the 17th ruler of the Korean kingdom of Silla.  He was the nephew of King Michu.  He married Michu's daughter, Lady Boban.  He is given the title Isageum, the same one borne by earlier rulers, in the Samguk Sagi; he is given the title Maripgan, borne by later rulers, in the Samguk Yusa.  He is the first to bear the title Maripgan in any record.

He is also the first king to appear by name in Chinese records.  It appears that there was a great influx of Chinese culture into Silla in his period, and that the widespread use of Chinese characters began in his time.  Naemul sent a tribute mission to the king of Early Jin in 381. This envoy visited Early Jin with the help of Goguryeo. In this tribute, Goguryeo represents Silla as a subordinate to Goguryeo. However, Silla acknowledges this because Goguryeo is needed to guard against Gaya-Japan Alliance.

Naemul's later reign was troubled by recurrent invasions by Wa Japan and the northern Malgal tribes.  This began with a massive Japanese incursion in 364, which was repulsed with great loss of life. 

In 392, Silla formed an alliance with Goguryeo and became the vassal of Goguryeo. 
In 393, Japan besieged the capital.
In 394, Silla achieved victory at Doksan (presumed present-day northern Pohang).
In 395, the Japanese army achieved victory after realizing that the left side of the Silla army was unguarded and attacked intensively until the Silla army was destroyed.
400-401, Imna-Japan Allied Forces Attacked Silla and war between Goguryeo-Silla Alliance and Imna-Japan Allied Forces. See also Gwanggaeto Stele.

His reign overlaps with Geunchogo of Baekje and Gwanggaeto the Great.

Family 

 Grandfather: Kim Gudo Galmunwang (구도 갈문왕)
Father: Kim Mal-gu (김말구), half–brother of King Michu.
Mother: Queen Hyulye ( 휴례부인 김씨), of the Kim clan
 Spouse: 
 Queen Boban (보반부인 김씨) of the Kim clan, eldest daughter of King Michu
 Son: Nulji of Silla (reigned 417–458) – the 17th King of Silla
Son: Kim Bokho (김복호)
Son: Kim Misaheun (미사흔)

See also
Three Kingdoms of Korea
List of Korean monarchs
List of Silla people

References

Silla rulers
402 deaths
4th-century monarchs in Asia
5th-century monarchs in Asia
Year of birth unknown
5th-century Korean people
4th-century Korean people